Chaduvukunna Ammayilu is a 1963 Indian Telugu-language drama film directed by Adurthi Subba Rao. It stars Akkineni Nageswara Rao, Savitri, Krishna Kumari with music composed by S. Rajeswara Rao. It was produced by D. Madhusudhana Rao under the Annapurna Pictures banner. The film is based on the Telugu novel Kaalaatheetha Vyakthulu, written by Dr. Sridevi. The film was recorded as a Super Hit at the box office.

Plot
Sujatha, daughter of a wealthy man, Raghunatha Rao and Vasantha, a middle-class girl are bosom friends. Once while Sujatha is teaching driving to Vasantha, their car accidentally dashes against a motorbike driven by Sekhar, a bank employee. The three become friends. Sujatha and Vasantha fall in love with Sekhar. But Sekhar responds to Vasantha.

Escaping from a forced marriage, Latha meets her childhood friends Sujatha and Vasantha. She is trapped by Anand, whose real aim is to marry Vasantha. He plays to act as helping Vasantha's grandfather Rangayya and his wife Mahalakshmi when they are in dire straits. After learning that Sekhar is in love with Vasantha, Sujatha agrees to marry police officer Prabhakar, whom her father has chosen for her. Anand deceives and implicates Sekhar in a theft case and Sekhar is on the run. Anand dumps Latha and when he is about to marry Vasantha, Sujatha steps in, proves him the culprit and unites Sekhar with Vasantha.

Cast
Akkineni Nageshwara Rao as Sekhar
Savitri as Sujatha
Krishna Kumari as Vasantha
Gummadi as Venkata Rangayya 
Relangi as Bramhanandayya
Padmanabham as Anand
Sobhan Babu as Prabhakar 
Allu Ramalingaiah as Bank Agent
Vinnakota Ramanna Panthulu
Suryakantham as  Vardhanamma
Hemalatha as Mahalakshmamma
E. V. Saroja as Latha

Crew
 Art: G. V. Subba Rao
 Choreography: Pasumarti
 Dialogues: Tripuraneni Gopichand
 Playback: Ghantasala, P. Susheela, P. B. Srinivas, Madhavapeddi Satyam, Swarnalatha, Ashalatha Kulkarni
 Lyrics: C. Narayana Reddy, Dasaradhi, Arudra, Kosaraju
 Associate Director: K. Viswanath
 Story: Dr. Sridevi
 Screenplay: D. Madhusudhana Rao, Adurthi Subba Rao, K. Viswanath
 Music: S. Rajeswara Rao
 Editor: T. Krishna
 Cinematography: P. S. Selvaraj
 Producer: D. Madhusudhana Rao
 Director: Adurthi Subba Rao
 Banner: Annapurna Pictures
 Release Date: 10 April 1963

Music 

Music was composed by S. Rajeswara Rao.

Release & Reception 
Chaduvukunna Ammayilu was released on 10 April 1963. Despite facing competition from Lava Kusa, the film ran for 100 days in theatres.

References

External links
 
 Chaduvukunna Ammayilu film review at Cinegoer.com

1963 films
1960s Telugu-language films
Indian black-and-white films
Indian drama films
Films based on Indian novels
Films scored by S. Rajeswara Rao
Films directed by Adurthi Subba Rao